is an extinct species of thistle in the family Asteraceae that was endemic to the Bonin Islands of Tōkyō Metropolis, Japan.

Taxonomy
The species was first described by Japanese botanist Gen-ichi Koidzumi in 1919.

Description
Cirsium toyoshimae had pale purple flowers and soft spines and was somewhat smaller than the extant Cirsium boninense. It used to grow in wooded areas near the coast.

Conservation status
Cirsium toyoshimae is classed as extinct on the Ministry of the Environment Red List.

References

toyoshimae
Flora of the Bonin Islands
Endemic flora of Japan
Plants described in 1919
Extinct flora of Asia